Luís Carlos Ribeiro Nunes Mendonça (born 16 January 1986) is a Portuguese cyclist, who currently rides for UCI Continental team .

Major results
2018
 1st Overall Volta ao Alentejo
2019
 2nd Overall Volta ao Alentejo
1st Points classification
2020
 3rd Overall Troféu Joaquim Agostinho
1st Stage 1
2022
 3rd Clássica da Arrábida

References

External links

1986 births
Living people
Portuguese male cyclists